"Kemp" is a song by the Swedish punk rock band Millencolin from the album Home from Home. It was released as a single on 18 February 2002, by Burning Heart Records, including two B-sides from the album's recording sessions, "The Downhill Walk" and "Absolute Zero". An accompanying music video for "Kemp" was also filmed and released.

"Kemp" originated as a B-side from the band's previous album Pennybridge Pioneers. This version had been released on their previous single "Fox" in 2000, and the song was rewritten with new lyrics for Home from Home.

Track listing
CD single
"Kemp"
"The Downhill Walk"
"Absolute Zero"

7" vinyl
Side A:
"Kemp"
Side B:
"The Downhill Walk"
"Absolute Zero"

Personnel

Millencolin
Nikola Sarcevic – lead vocals, bass
Erik Ohlsson – guitar
Mathias Färm – guitar
Fredrik Larzon – drums

Charts

References

Millencolin songs
2002 singles
Burning Heart Records singles
2002 songs
Songs written by Mathias Färm
Songs written by Nikola Šarčević
Songs written by Fredrik Larzon
Songs written by Erik Ohlsson (musician)